Charles Richard Donnelly (11 September 1941 – 21 July 2016) was a Scottish footballer, broadcaster, and journalist.

Early and personal life
Donnelly was born in Lochee, Dundee and attended Harris Academy in the city.

He was married with one son, one daughter, and three grandchildren.

Career
After working as an apprentice at DC Thomson, Donnelly began his footballer, playing as a goalkeeper for Carnoustie Panmure, East Fife, Brechin City and Arbroath. He made 79 appearances for East Fife in the Scottish Football League, and 107 appearances in all competitions.

Donnelly began writing Sunday match reports for The Courier in the late 1960s, before becoming a full-time journalist with The People's Journal and the Scottish Sunday Express.

He also broadcast on the radio with Radio Tay and Radio Clyde.

References

1941 births
2016 deaths
Scottish footballers
Carnoustie Panmure F.C. players
East Fife F.C. players
Brechin City F.C. players
Arbroath F.C. players
Scottish Football League players
Association football goalkeepers
Scottish journalists
Scottish broadcasters
Footballers from Dundee
People educated at Harris Academy
Journalists from Dundee
People from Lochee